Moshannon Valley Junior/Senior High School is a public high school located near the borough of Houtzdale, Pennsylvania.  The high school serves students from most of southeastern Clearfield County. The school's mascot is the Black Knights. The school is part of the Moshannon Valley School District.

References

Educational institutions in the United States with year of establishment missing
Public high schools in Pennsylvania
Schools in Clearfield County, Pennsylvania